Techno City is a locality situated at Panchpota in Garia, close to Kolkata, India. It is located near the Garia railway station, New Garia railway station and Kavi Subhash metro station.
It is named after the Techno India Group who have set up two schools and an engineering college (Netaji Subhash Engineering College) here.

External links
 Techno City at Google Maps

See also
 New Garia

Neighbourhoods in Kolkata